Mix Megapol is a private Swedish radio network controlled by Bauer Media Group. It launched in 1993 under the name Skärgårdsradion (Archipelago Radio). Later that year the name was changed to Radio Megapol when the broadcasting permissions were auctioned out. In 1997 the word "Mix" was added and their slogan became "The best mix of hits and oldies". Mix Megapol is on air in 24 cities from Kiruna in the north to Malmö in the south. They have over two million listeners per week. Their target group is people aged between 25 and 45.

Affiliates

External links
 Mix Megapol

Radio stations in Sweden
Bauer Media Group